Gala is a township of Kangmar County, Tibet Autonomous Region, China. It has four villages under its administration.

See also
List of towns and villages in Tibet

References

Populated places in Shigatse
Township-level divisions of Tibet